Sonnac may refer to the following places in France:

Sonnac, Aveyron, a commune in the department of Aveyron
Sonnac, Charente-Maritime, a commune in the department of Charente-Maritime
Sonnac-sur-l'Hers, a commune in the department of Aude